Steuben Township is a township in Crawford County, Pennsylvania, United States. The population was 776 at the 2020 census, down from 804 at the 2010 census, down from 908 in 2000.

Geography
Steuben township is in eastern Crawford County. The borough of Townville, a separate municipality, is surrounded by the western side of the township.

Natural Features
Rome Township lies at the southern terminal moraine for glaciation in northwestern Pennsylvania. The eastern half of Steuben Township is drained by Oil Creek and its tributaries, which include Marsh Run and DeWolfe Run. The western side of the township is drained by tributaries to French Creek.

Demographics

As of the census of 2000, there were 908 people, 336 households, and 237 families residing in the township.  The population density was 37.0 people per square mile (14.3/km).  There were 413 housing units at an average density of 16.8/sq mi (6.5/km).  The racial makeup of the township was 98.24% White, 0.44% African American, 0.11% Native American, 0.33% Asian, 0.33% Pacific Islander, 0.11% from other races, and 0.44% from two or more races. Hispanic or Latino of any race were 0.11% of the population.

There were 336 households, out of which 35.7% had children under the age of 18 living with them, 61.9% were married couples living together, 6.0% had a female householder with no husband present, and 29.2% were non-families. 22.9% of all households were made up of individuals, and 11.3% had someone living alone who was 65 years of age or older.  The average household size was 2.70 and the average family size was 3.23.

In the township the population was spread out, with 30.4% under the age of 18, 4.7% from 18 to 24, 29.7% from 25 to 44, 20.5% from 45 to 64, and 14.6% who were 65 years of age or older.  The median age was 36 years. For every 100 females, there were 104.0 males.  For every 100 females age 18 and over, there were 102.6 males.

The median income for a household in the township was $30,568, and the median income for a family was $35,750. Males had a median income of $32,188 versus $19,773 for females. The per capita income for the township was $13,089.  About 12.9% of families and 16.2% of the population were below the poverty line, including 16.8% of those under age 18 and 12.7% of those age 65 or over.

References

Townships in Crawford County, Pennsylvania
Townships in Pennsylvania